KLFC is a radio station airing a Contemporary Christian music format licensed to Branson, Missouri, broadcasting on 88.1 MHz FM.  The station is owned by Mountaintop Broadcasting, Inc.

References

External links

Contemporary Christian radio stations in the United States
Branson, Missouri
LFC